René Eugène Le Somptier (12 November 1884 in Caen – 23 September 1950 in Paris) was a French filmmaker and journalist.

He made his first short film, Poum à la chasse, in 1908 with his father as an actor. He was injured in World War I and after the war together with Charles Burguet made his first full-length film, La sultane de l’amour (1918).

In 1922 he produced La dame de Montsoreau based on a novel by Alexandre Dumas, starring Geneviève Félix. A colorized version was released in 1925.

Films
Poum à la chasse (1908)
Un drame de l'air (1913)
La sultane de l’amour (1918)
La montée vers l'Acropole (1920)
La dame de Montsoreau (1922)
 The Bread Peddler (1923)
La forêt qui tue (1926)
Le p'tit Parigot (1926) - a movie serial in 6 parts
Le dernier conte de Shéhérazade (1937)

Notes and references

Sources

External links

French film directors
1884 births
1950 deaths
French male non-fiction writers
20th-century French journalists
20th-century French male writers